Mauricio Báez is a Santo Domingo Metro station on Line 2. It was open on 1 April 2013 as part of the inaugural section of Line 2 between María Montez and Eduardo Brito. The station is located between Colonel Rafael Tomás Fernández and Ramón Cáceres.

This is an underground station built below Expreso V Centenario. It is named in honor of Mauricio Báez.

References

Santo Domingo Metro stations
2013 establishments in the Dominican Republic
Railway stations opened in 2013